The following is a family tree of Korean monarchs.

Goguryeo

Baekje

Silla 

Silla (57 BC – 935 CE) was one of the Three Kingdoms of Korea. In the early years, Silla was ruled by the Pak, Seok, and Gim families. Rulers of Silla had various titles, including Isageum, Maripgan, and Daewang. Like some Baekje kings, some declared themselves emperor.

|-
|style="text-align: left;"|Notes:

Balhae 
Balhae (698-926) was an ancient Korean kingdom established after the fall of Goguryeo. Balhae occupied southern parts of Northeast China, Primorsky Krai, and the northern part of the Korean Peninsula.

Goryeo 
The Goryeo dynasty ruled in Korea from 918 to 1392. It comprised 34 kings in 17 generations. What follows is, first, a selective genealogy of the reigning Wang clan, and second, a table showing the relations between the Mongol-led Yuan dynasty and Goryeo royalty.

Marriage relations with Mongol Empire 

|-
|style="text-align: left;"|Notes:

Joseon and Korean Empire 

– – – – – – - The dashed lines denote the adoptions

See also
 History of Korea
 List of monarchs of Korea
 House of Yi

Notes

References

Family trees
Korean royalty
Dynasty genealogy